Skin Wars is a body painting reality competition hosted by Rebecca Romijn that premiered on the American pay-television channel Game Show Network on August 6, 2014. Contestants on the series perform challenges containing body painting each episode. At the end of each episode, one contestant is eliminated and told "It's time to wash off your canvas."

Production
On September 12, 2013, GSN ordered eight episodes of the series, making it GSN's first television show devoted to body art. On February 4, 2014, GSN announced Rebecca Romijn as host of Skin Wars, with RuPaul Charles, Craig Tracy and Robin Slonina serving as judges.

The series premiered on GSN August 6, 2014. That same night, the network also began airing an online series entitled Skin Wars: The Naked Truth with Kandee Johnson airing immediately after Skin Wars on DOOR3, GSN's YouTube channel targeted toward 18- to 25-year-olds. The series features commentary from Johnson as well as highlights from that night's episode and a "Skinterview" with one of the contestants.

On September 30, 2014, GSN announced plans to air a ten-episode second season of Skin Wars with Romijn and all three judges returning to reprise their respective roles. The second season premiered June 10, 2015.

A spinoff called Skin Wars: Fresh Paint hosted by RuPaul aired as a special on August 26, 2015.  It featured six highly accomplished artists, each at the top of their game, as they leave their comfort zones to compete in body painting for the first time. The artists must conquer three difficult challenges as they are mentored by three top artists from the first season, Dutch Bihary, Lawrence "Gear" Duran and Season One champion, Natalie Fletcher.   As the artists work closely with their body painting mentors they try to quickly master the craft and win the $10,000 prize and become champion. It premiered to 456,000 viewers. Later, it became a series itself, premiering on June 15, 2016.

On August 27, 2015, GSN renewed the series for a third season.<ref>{{cite press release|url=http://corp.gsn.com/press/releases/gsn-announces-season-three-pick-groundbreaking-original-hit-series-skin-wars|title=GSN Announces Season Three Pick-up of Groundbreaking Original Hit Series Skin Wars|publisher=GSN Corporate|date=August 27, 2015|access-date=August 28, 2015}}</ref>

The winners of the program in chronological order are as follows: Natalie Fletcher, Lana Chronium and Rick Uribe.

Series overview

Season 1 (2014)

Contestants
The 10 body painters competing in the first season were:

Contestant progress

 The contestant won Skin Wars.
  The contestant was the runner-up.
  The contestant placed 3rd overall.
 The contestant won the weekly challenge.
 The contestant placed in the top, but did not win the challenge.
 The contestant placed in the bottom, but was not up for elimination.
 The contestant placed in the bottom 2 and up for elimination.
 The contestant was eliminated.
  The contestant went into a face off against another contestant and won.
 The contestant was eliminated after a face off against another contestant.
 ‡ The contestant won the mini challenge

Season 2 (2015)

Contestants
The 12 body painters competing in the second season were:

Contestant progress

 The contestant won Skin Wars.
  The contestant was the runner-up.
  The contestant placed 3rd overall.
 The contestant won the weekly challenge.
 The contestant placed in the top, but did not win the challenge.
 The contestant placed in the bottom, but was not up for elimination.
 The contestant placed in the bottom 2 and up for elimination.
 The contestant was eliminated.
  The contestant went into a face off against another contestant and won.
 The contestant was eliminated after a face off against another contestant.
 ‡ The contestant won the mini challenge.

Season 3 (2016)

Contestants
The 12 body painters competing in the third season were:

Contestant progress

 The contestant won Skin Wars''.
  The contestant was the runner-up.
  The contestant placed 3rd overall.
 The contestant won the weekly challenge.
 The contestant placed in the top, but did not win the challenge.
 The contestant was in the bottom 2, but neither was eliminated.
 The contestant placed in the bottom, but was not up for elimination.
 The contestant placed in the bottom 2 and up for elimination.
 The contestant was eliminated.
 The contestant quit the competition.
 ‡ The contestant won the mini  challenge.

 In Episode 5, Hans quit the competition at panel after a fall out with the judges.

References

2010s American reality television series
Body painting